Erzaldi Rosman Djohan (born 31 October 1969) is an Indonesian politician who has served as the Governor of Bangka-Belitung Islands since 2017 to 2022. Prior to becoming governor, he was elected two times as the regent of Central Bangka Regency.

Early life and education
Djohan was born on 31 October 1969 in Pangkal Pinang (then part of South Sumatra province) from Rosman Djohan and Melati. He completed his high school education in Pangkal Pinang, before moving to Jakarta, earning a diploma in 1994 from Tarumanegara University. Later, he also obtained a bachelors and masters from an economics institute.

Career
Before entering politics, Djohan worked at several companies, including a property company between 1999 and 2005. In 2004, he was elected to Bangka-Belitung's Regional People's Representative Council (DPRD) as part of Golkar, though he only held the seat until 2005 when he was elected as Central Bangka's vice-regent. In 2010, he was elected regent, and was elected for his second term in 2015 with 57.1% of votes. His first term expired on 24 September 2015, before he was sworn in for a second term on 17 February 2016.

Djohan declared his candidacy for the governorship of the province in August 2016. By then, he had moved to Gerindra, and became the chairman of its provincial branch. In the following 2017 gubernatorial election, Djohan won 38.9% (213,442) of votes in a four-way election, defeating incumbent governor Rustam Effendi.

Governorship
On 12 May 2017, Djohan was sworn in as governor. Months after his inauguration, Djohan declared a moratorium on issuing new tin mining licenses in the province, intended to tackle illegal mining on the island and allow the provincial government to develop new regulations on ecologically friendly mining practices. He noted his intentions in an interview with Jakarta Globe to move away from tin mining, and develop tourism and metallurgical industries such as thorium extraction.

Alongside South Sumatra governor Herman Deru, Djohan has supported a bridge spanning the Bangka Strait, connecting Bangka Island with mainland Sumatra.

References

1969 births
People from Pangkal Pinang
Governors of the Bangka Belitung Islands
Mayors and regents of places in the Bangka Belitung Islands
Great Indonesia Movement Party politicians
Golkar politicians
Members of Indonesian provincial assemblies
Living people
Tarumanagara University alumni
Regents of places in Indonesia